Water Margin (Shuihu zhuan) is one of the earliest Chinese novels written in vernacular Mandarin, and is attributed to Shi Nai'an. It is also translated as Outlaws of the Marsh  and All Men Are Brothers. 

The story, which is set in the Northern Song dynasty (around 1120), tells of how a group of 108 outlaws gather at Mount Liang (or Liangshan Marsh) to rebel against the government. Later they are granted amnesty and enlisted by the government to resist the nomadic conquest of the Liao dynasty and other rebels. While the book's authorship is traditionally attributed to Shi Nai'an (1296–1372), the first external reference to the novel only appeared in 1524 during the Jiajing reign of the Ming dynasty, sparking a long-lasting academic debate on when it was actually written and which historical events the author had witnessed that inspired him to write the book.

It is considered one of the masterpieces of early vernacular fiction and Chinese literature. It has introduced readers to many of the best-known characters in Chinese literature, such as Wu Song, Lin Chong, Pan Jinlian, Song Jiang and Lu Zhishen.  Water Margin also exerted a towering influence in the development of fiction elsewhere in East Asia, such as in Japanese literature.

Historical context and development
Water Margin is based on the exploits of the outlaw Song Jiang and his 108 companions (The 36 "Heavenly Spirits" (三十六天罡) and the 72 "Earthly Demons" (七十二地煞)). The group was active in the Huainan region and surrendered to the Song government in 1121. They were recorded in the historical text History of Song in the annals of Emperor Huizong of Song, which states:

Zhang Shuye's biography further describes the activities of Song Jiang and the other outlaws, and tells they were eventually defeated by Zhang.

Folk stories about Song Jiang circulated during the Southern Song. The first known source to name Song Jiang's 36 companions was Miscellaneous Observations from the Year of Guixin (癸辛雜識) by Zhou Mi, written in the 13th century. Among the 36 are Lu Junyi, Guan Sheng, Ruan Xiao'er, Ruan Xiaowu, Ruan Xiaoqi, Liu Tang, Hua Rong and Wu Yong. Some of the characters who later became associated with Song Jiang also appeared around this time. They include Sun Li, Yang Zhi, Lin Chong, Lu Zhishen and Wu Song.

A palace memorial by Hou Meng, included in the History of Song, states: "Song Jiang and 36 others cross Qi and Wei (the central belt of the North China Plain) at will. Government troops number tens of thousands but no one dares oppose him. His abilities must be extraordinary. Since we also face plunders by Fang La and his outlaws from Qingxi, why not grant Song Jiang and his men amnesty and request them to lead a campaign against Fang La to redeem themselves?"

A direct precursor of Water Margin is Old Incidents in the Xuanhe Period of the Great Song Dynasty (大宋宣和遺事), which appeared around the mid-13th century. The text is a written version of storytellers' tales based on supposed historical events. It is divided into ten chapters, roughly covering the history of the Song dynasty from the early 11th century to the establishment of the Southern Song regime in 1127. The fourth chapter covers the adventures of Song Jiang and his 36 companions, and their eventual defeat by Zhang Shuye. Versions of some of the stories and characters in Water Margin are clearly visible, including "Yang Zhi Sells His Precious Sabre", "Robbing the Convoy of Birthday Gifts", "Song Jiang Kills Yan Poxi", and "Fighting Fang La". Song Jiang and his outlaws are said to operate in the Taihang Mountains.

Stories about the outlaws became a popular subject for Yuan dynasty drama. During this time, the material on which Water Margin was based evolved into its current form. The number of outlaws increased to 108. Even though they come from different backgrounds, and include scholars, fishermen, imperial drill instructors, officers, and others, all of them eventually come to occupy Mount Liang (or Liangshan Marsh).

Author's inspiration and dates
While the book's authorship is attributed to Shi Nai'an (1296–1372), there is an extensive academic debate on what historical events the author had witnessed that inspired him to write the book, which forms a wider debate on when the book was written.  The first external reference of this book, which dated to 1524 during a chit-chat among Ming dynasty officials, is a reliable evidence because it presents strong falsifiability. Other scholars put the date to the mid-14th century, sometime between the fall of the Mongol-ruled Yuan dynasty and the early Ming dynasty. 

Both the Jiajing reign of Ming dynasty (1521-1568) and the closing years of Mongol-ruled Yuan dynasty (1360s) were marked by a chain of rebellions, which confused scholars a lot as to which of the two inspired the author, and hence when was the book written. The proponents of the Yuan dynasty argued that Water Margin became popular during the Yuan as the common people (predominantly Han Chinese) resented the Mongol rulers. The ambivalence persisted into later times, and the Chongzhen Emperor of the Ming dynasty, acting on the advice of his ministers, banned the book.

Plot
The opening episode in the novel is the release of the 108 Spirits, imprisoned under an ancient stele-bearing tortoise.

The next chapter describes the rise of Gao Qiu, one of the primary antagonists of the story. Gao abuses his status as a Grand Marshal by oppressing Wang Jin; Wang's father taught Gao a painful lesson when the latter was still a street-roaming ruffian. Wang Jin flees from the capital with his mother and by chance he meets Shi Jin, who becomes his apprentice. The next few chapters tell the story of Shi Jin's friend Lu Zhishen, followed by the story of Lu's sworn brother Lin Chong. Lin Chong is framed by Gao Qiu for attempting to assassinate him, and almost dies in a fire at a supply depot set by Gao's henchmen. He slays his foes and abandons the depot, eventually making his way to Liangshan Marsh, where he becomes an outlaw. Meanwhile, the "Original Seven", led by Chao Gai, rob a convoy of birthday gifts for the Imperial Tutor Cai Jing, another primary antagonist in the novel. They flee to Liangshan Marsh after defeating a group of soldiers sent by the authorities to arrest them, and settle there as outlaws with Chao Gai as their chief. As the story progresses, more people come to join the outlaw band, including military personnel and civil officials who grew tired of serving the corrupt government, as well as men with special skills and talents. Stories of the outlaws are told in separate sections in the following chapters. Connections between characters are vague, but the individual stories are eventually pieced together by chapter 60 when Song Jiang succeeds Chao Gai as the leader of the band after the latter is killed in a battle against the Zeng Family Fortress.

The plot further develops by illustrating the conflicts between the outlaws and the Song government after the Grand Assembly of the 108 outlaws. Song Jiang strongly advocates making peace with the government and seeking redress for the outlaws. After defeating the imperial army in a great battle at Liangshan Marsh, the outlaws eventually receive amnesty from Emperor Huizong. The emperor recruits them to form a military contingent and sends them on campaigns against invaders from the Liao dynasty and rebel forces led by Tian Hu, Wang Qing and Fang La within the Song dynasty's domain. Although the former outlaws eventually emerge victorious against the rebels and Liao invaders, the campaigns also led to the tragic dissolution of the 108 heroes. At least two-thirds of them died in battle while the surviving ones either return to the imperial capital to receive honours from the emperor and continue serving the Song government, or leave and spend the rest of their lives as commoners elsewhere. Song Jiang himself is eventually poisoned to death by the "Four Treacherous Ministers" – Gao Qiu, Yang Jian, Tong Guan and Cai Jing.

Outline of chapters
This outline of chapters is based on a 100 chapters edition. Yang Dingjian's 120 chapters edition includes other campaigns of the outlaws on behalf of Song dynasty, while Jin Shengtan's 70 chapters edition omits the chapters on the outlaws' acceptance of amnesty and subsequent campaigns.

The extended version includes the Liangshan heroes' expeditions against the rebel leaders Tian Hu and Wang Qing prior to the campaign against Fang La.

Other stories are told such as the heroes fighting the Jurchen-ruled Jin dynasty or moving to Siam.

Themes

Water Margin, praised as an early "masterpiece" of vernacular fiction, is renowned for the "mastery and control" of its mood and tone. The novel is also known for its use of vivid, humorous and especially racy language. However, it has been denounced as "obscene" by various critics since the Ming dynasty.

Susan L. Mann writes that the "desire for male camaraderie" is "far from a mere plotline," for it is a basic theme of this and other classic novels. She places the novel's male characters in a tradition of men's culture of mutual trust and reciprocal obligation, such as figures known as the Chinese knight-errant.  Sima Qian, the Han dynasty historian, devoted a section to biographies: "Their words were always sincere and trustworthy, and their actions always quick and decisive. They were always true to what they promised, and without regard to their own persons, they would rush into dangers threatening others." She finds such figures in this and other novels, such as Romance of the Three Kingdoms and Journey to the West, all of which dramatized the "empathic emotional attraction between men who appreciate and play off against one another's complementary qualities." 

Licentious and treacherous women are another recurring theme. Modern critics have debated whether Water Margin is misogynistic.  Most beautiful women in the novel are depicted as immoral and cruel, and they are often involved in schemes against the protagonists. Among them is Pan Jinlian, the sister-in-law of Wu Song, who has later become an archetypal femme fatale and one of the most notorious villainesses of classical Chinese culture. On the other hand, the few "good" women in the story, like Sun Erniang and Gu Dasao, are not particularly noted for their beauty, or are even described as being plain or ugly.  The leader of the outlaws, Song Jiang admonished "Any outlaw that meddles with women is contemptible." 

Critics offer various explanations for Water Margin'''s prejudice against women. Most common among modern Chinese critics is the patriarchal society of the Imperial China. Professor Sun Shuyu of The Chinese University of Hong Kong argues that the author(s) of Water Margin intentionally vilified women in order to discipline their would-be-outlaw audiences.

Authorship
Since fiction was not at first a prestigious genre in the Chinese literary world, authorship of early novels was not attributed and may be unknowable. The authorship of Water Margin is still in some sense uncertain, and the text in any case derived from many sources and involved many editorial hands. While the novel was traditionally attributed to Shi Nai'an, of whose life nothing is reliably known, recent scholars think that the novel, or portions of it, may have been written or revised by Luo Guanzhong (the author of Romance of the Three Kingdoms). Other contenders include Shi Hui (施惠) and Guo Xun (郭勛).

Shi Nai'an

Many scholars believe that the first 70 chapters were indeed written by Shi Nai'an; however the authorship of the final 30 chapters is often questioned, with some speculating that it was instead written by Luo Guanzhong, who may have been a student of Shi. Another theory, which first appeared in Gao Ru's Baichuan Shuzhi (百川書志) during the Ming dynasty, suggests that the whole novel was written and compiled by Shi, and then edited by Luo.

Shi drew from oral and written texts that had accumulated over time. Stories of the Liangshan outlaws first appeared in Old incidents in the Xuanhe period of the great Song dynasty (大宋宣和遺事) and had been circulating since the Southern Song dynasty, while folk tales and opera related to Water Margin have already existed long before the novel itself came into existence. This theory suggests that Shi Nai'an gathered and compiled these pieces of information to write Water Margin.

Luo Guanzhong
Some believe that Water Margin was written entirely by Luo Guanzhong. Wang Daokun (汪道昆), who lived during the reign of the Jiajing Emperor in the Ming dynasty, first mentioned in Classification of Water Margin (水滸傳敘) that: "someone with the family name Luo, who was a native of Wuyue (Yue (a reference to the southern China region covering Zhejiang), wrote the 100-chapter novel." Several scholars from the Ming and Qing dynasties, after Wang Daokun's time, also said that Luo was the author of Water Margin. During the early Republican era, Lu Xun and Yu Pingbo suggested that the simplified edition of Water Margin was written by Luo, while the traditional version was by Shi Nai'an.

However, Huikang Yesou (惠康野叟) in Shi Yu (識餘) disagree with Wang Daokun's view on the grounds that there were significant differences between Water Margin and Romance of the Three Kingdoms, therefore these two novels could not have been written by the same person.

Hu Shih felt that the draft of Water Margin was done by Luo Guanzhong, and could have contained the chapters on the outlaws' campaigns against Tian Hu, Wang Qing and Fang La, but not invaders from the Liao dynasty.

Another theory states that Luo Guanzhong was from the Southern Song period vice the Ming dynasty. Cheng Muheng (程穆衡) suggested in Notes on Water Margin (水滸傳注略) that Luo lived in the late Southern Song dynasty and early Yuan era. Huang Lin'gen (黃霖根) pointed out that the name of one of the compilers of Anecdotes of Jingkang (靖康稗史) was Nai'an, and suggested that this "Nai'an", who lived during the Southern Song dynasty, was Shi Nai'an. He also felt that Shi wrote a simplified version of Water Margin, which is not the current edition.

Shi Hui
Another candidate is Shi Hui (施惠), a nanxi (southern opera) playwright who lived between the late Yuan dynasty and early Ming dynasty. Xu Fuzuo (徐復祚) of the Ming dynasty mentioned in Sanjia Cunlao Weitan (三家村老委談) that Junmei (君美; Shi Hui's courtesy name)'s intention in writing Water Margin was to entertain people, and not to convey any message. During the Qing dynasty, Shi Hui and Shi Nai'an were linked, suggesting that they are actually the same person. An unnamed writer wrote in Chuanqi Huikao Biaomu (傳奇會考標目) that Shi Nai'an's given name was actually "Hui", courtesy name "Juncheng" (君承), and he was a native of Hangzhou. Sun Kaidi (孫楷第) also wrote in Bibliography of Chinese Popular Fiction that "Nai'an" was Shi Hui's pseudonym. Later studies revealed that Water Margin contained lines in the Jiangsu and Zhejiang variety of Chinese, and that You Gui Ji (幽闺记), a work of Shi Hui, bore some resemblance to Water Margin, hence the theory that Water Margin was authored by Shi Hui.

Guo Xun
Early scholars attributed the authorship to Guo Xun (郭勛), a politician who lived in the Ming dynasty. Shen Defu (沈德符), a late Ming dynasty scholar, mentioned in Wanli Yehuo Bian (萬曆野獲編) that Guo wrote Water Margin. Shen Guoyuan (沈國元) added in Huangming Congxin Lu (皇明從信錄) that Guo mimicked the writing styles of Romance of the Three Kingdoms and Water Margin to write Guochao Yinglie Ji (國朝英烈記). Qian Xiyan (錢希言) also stated in Xi Gu (戲嘏) that Guo edited Water Margin before.  Hu Shih countered in his Research on Water Margin (水滸傳新考) that Guo Xun's name was used as a disguise for the real author of Water Margin. Dai Bufan (戴不凡) had a differing view, as he suspected that Guo wrote Water Margin, and then used "Shi Nai'an" to conceal his identity as the author of the novel 

Editions

The textual history of the novel is extraordinarily complex for there are early editions of varying lengths, different parts, and variations. Not until the 1920s were there studies which began to set these questions in order, and there is still disagreement. The earliest components of the Water Margin (in manuscript copies) were from the late 14th century. A printed copy dating from the Jiaqing reign (1507-1567) titled Jingben Zhongyi Zhuan (京本忠義傳), is preserved in the Shanghai Library. The earliest extant complete printed edition of Water Margin is a 100-chapter version published in 1589.  An edition, with 120 chapters by Yang Dingjian (楊定見), has been preserved from the reign of the Wanli Emperor (1573–1620) in the Ming dynasty. Yet other editions were published in the early Qing dynasty. 

The most widely read version is a truncated recension published by Jin Shengtan in 1643, reprinted many times, which became the standard text for later editions and most translations.  Jin provided three introductions that praised the novel as a work of genius and inserted commentaries into the text that explained how to read the novel. He cut matter that he thought irrelevant, reduced the number of chapters to 70 by turning chapter 1 into a prologue, and added an ending in which all 108 heroes are executed.

The various editions can be classified into simplified and complex. The simplified editions, edited for less sophisticated audiences, can contain all the events but in less detail. There is no way of knowing whether a simplified edition came before or was derived from another by adding or cutting text.

Simplified editions
The simplified editions include stories on the outlaws being granted amnesty, followed by their campaigns against the Liao dynasty, Tian Hu, Wang Qing and Fang La, all the way until Song Jiang's death. At one point, the later chapters were compiled into a separate novel, titled Sequel to Water Margin (續水滸傳), which is attributed to Luo Guanzhong.

Known simplified editions of Water Margin include:

 A 115-chapter edition, Masterpieces of the Han and Song dynasties (漢宋奇書)
 A 110-chapter edition, Chronicles of Heroes (英雄譜)
 A 164-chapter edition, combined with Sequel to Water MarginComplex editions
The complex editions are more descriptive and circulated more widely than their simplified counterparts. The three main versions of the complex editions are a 100-chapter, a 120-chapter and a 70-chapter edition. The most commonly modified parts of the complex editions are the stories on what happened after the outlaws are granted amnesty.

 100-chapter edition: Includes the outlaws' campaigns against the Liao dynasty and Fang La after they have been granted amnesty.
 120-chapter edition: An extended version of the 100-chapter edition, includes the outlaws' campaigns against Tian Hu and Wang Qing (chapters 91 to 110).
 71-chapter edition: Edited by Jin Shengtan in the late Ming dynasty, this edition uses Chapter 1 as a prologue and ends at Chapter 71 of the original version, and does not include the stories about the outlaws being granted amnesty and their campaigns.

TranslationsWater Margin has been translated into many languages. The book was translated into Manchu as Möllendorff: Sui hū bithe. Japanese translations date back to at least 1757, when the first volume of an early Suikoden (Water Margin rendered in Japanese) was printed. Other early adaptations include Takebe Ayakari's 1773 Japanese Water Margin (Honcho suikoden), the 1783 Women's Water Margin (Onna suikoden), and Santō Kyōden's 1801 Chushingura Water Margin (Chushingura suikoden).

In 1805, Kyokutei Bakin released a Japanese translation of the Water Margin illustrated by Hokusai. The book, called the New Illustrated Edition of the Suikoden (Shinpen Suikogaden), was a success during the Edo period and spurred a Japanese "Suikoden" craze.

In 1827, publisher Kagaya Kichibei commissioned Utagawa Kuniyoshi to produce a series of woodblock prints illustrating the 108 heroes in Water Margin. The 1827–1830 series, called 108 Heroes of the Water Margin or Tsuzoku Suikoden goketsu hyakuhachinin no hitori, catapulted Kuniyoshi to fame. It also brought about a craze for multicoloured pictorial tattoos that covered the entire body from the neck to the mid-thigh.

Following the great commercial success of the Kuniyoshi series, other ukiyo-e artists were commissioned to produce prints of the Water Margin heroes, which began to be shown as Japanese heroes rather than the original Chinese personages.

Among these later series was Yoshitoshi's 1866–1867 series of 50 designs in Chuban size, which are darker than Kuniyoshi's and feature strange ghosts and monsters.
A recent Japanese translation is 

The book was first translated into Thai in 1867, originally in samud thai (Thai paper book) format, consisting of 82 volumes in total. It was printed in western style in 1879 and distributed commercially by Dan Beach Bradley, an American Protestant missionary to Siam.

Jacques Dars translated the 70 chapter version into French in 1978, reprinted several times.

Pearl S. Buck was the first English translator of the entire 70-chapter version. Titled All Men are Brothers and published in 1933. The book was well received by the American public. However, it was also criticised for its errors, such as the mistranslation of Lu Zhishen's nickname "Flowery Monk" as "Priest Hua". In 1937, another complete translation appeared, titled Water Margin, by J. H. Jackson, edited by Fang Lo-Tien.

Later translations of the 70 chapter version include Chinese-naturalised scholar Sidney Shapiro's Outlaws of the Marsh (1980), which also does not include the verse. However, as it was published during the Cultural Revolution, this edition received little attention then. It is a translation of a combination of both the 70-chapter and 100-chapter versions. 

The most recent translation, titled The Marshes Of Mount Liang, by Alex and John Dent-Young, is a five-volume translation of the 120-chapter version. Includes a prologue but omits the foreword by Shi Nai'an and some passages related to the official details of the Ming Dynasty.

These translations differ in the selection of texts and completeness. The Jackson translation is the only translation to contain Shi Nai'an's foreword. The Shapiro translation omits the prologue, the foreword, and most of the poems. The Dent-Young translation omits the author's foreword and the passages concerning the Ming Dynasty administration and the translators admitted to compromising some details and retaining inconsistencies in their Brief Note on the Translation.

Influences and adaptations

LiteratureJin Ping Mei is an erotic novel written under the pen-name Lanling Xiaoxiao Sheng (蘭陵笑笑生) ("The Scoffing Scholar of Lanling") in the late Ming dynasty. The novel is based on the story of Wu Song avenging his brother in Water Margin, but the focus is on Ximen Qing's sexual relations with other women, including Pan Jinlian. In Water Margin, Ximen Qing is killed by Wu Song for murdering the latter's brother, while in Jin Ping Mei he dies a horrible death due to an accidental overdose of aphrodisiac pills.Shuihu Houzhuan (水滸後傳), which roughly translates to The Later Story of Water Margin, is a novel written by Chen Chen (陳忱) in the Qing dynasty. The story is set after the end of the original Water Margin, with Li Jun as the protagonist. It tells of how the surviving Liangshan heroes are forced to become outlaws again due to corruption in the government. When the armies of the Jurchen-ruled Jin dynasty invade the Song dynasty, the heroes rise up to defend their nation from the invaders. The heroes eventually decide to leave China for good and sail to distant lands. Apart from the surviving Liangshan heroes from the original novel, Shuihu Houzhuan also introduces new characters such as Hua Rong's son Hua Fengchun (花逢春), Xu Ning's son Xu Sheng (徐晟) and Huyan Zhuo's son Huyan Yu (呼延鈺).Dang Kou Zhi (蕩寇志), which roughly translates to The Tale of Eliminating Bandits, is a novel written by Yu Wanchun (俞萬春) during the reign of the Daoguang Emperor in the Qing dynasty. Yu disagreed that the Liangshan outlaws are loyal and righteous heroes, and was determined to portray them as ruthless mass murderers and destroyers, hence he wrote Dang Kou Zhi. The novel, which starts at the Grand Assembly of the 108 outlaws at Liangshan Marsh, tells of how the outlaws plundered and pillaged cities before they are eventually eliminated by government forces led by Zhang Shuye (張叔夜) and his lieutenants Chen Xizhen (陳希真) and Yun Tianbiao (雲天彪).

The Qing dynasty writer Qian Cai intertwined the life stories of Yue Fei and the outlaws Lin Chong and Lu Junyi in The Story of Yue Fei (1684). He stated that the latter were former students of the general's martial arts tutor, Zhou Tong. However, literary critic C. T. Hsia commented that the connection was a fictional one created by the author. The Republican era folktale Swordplay Under the Moon, by Wang Shaotang, further intertwines Yue Fei's history with the outlaws by adding Wu Song to the list of Zhou's former students. The tale is set in the background of Wu Song's mission to Kaifeng, prior to the murder of his brother. Zhou tutors Wu in the "rolling dragon" style of swordplay during his one-month stay in the capital city. It also said that Zhou is a sworn brother of Lu Zhishen and shares the same nickname with the executioner-turned-outlaw Cai Fu.

Frank Chin's novel, Donald Duk, contains many references to the Water Margin. Song Jiang and Li Kui make several appearances in the protagonist's dreams.Rise of the Water Margin (水滸再起) is a novel launched in 2022 by the American author Christopher Bates in which all of the Chinese characters and their approximate character arcs are 21st century modernizations of people in The Water Margin.  In this cyber-thriller, the characters of Lin Chong, Lu Da, Gao Qiu, Gao Yanei, Zhang Zhenniang, Fu An, Cai Jing, Chai Jin, Wang Lun, Zhu Gui, Zhao Ji, Li Shishi and many others appear.  The location of Liangshanpo is a deserted ghost city known to its investors as Mount Liang Swamp, repurposed as a hacker enclave.

Eiji Yoshikawa wrote Shin Suikoden (新水滸伝), which roughly translates to "New Tales from the Water Margin".

In addition to its colossal popularity in China, Water Margin has been identified as one of the most influential works in the development of early modern Japanese literature.

ComicsWater Margin is referred to in numerous Japanese manga, such as Tetsuo Hara and Buronson's Fist of the North Star, and Masami Kurumada's Fūma no Kojirō, Otokozaka and Saint Seiya. In both works of fiction, characters bearing the same stars of the Water Margin characters as personal emblems of destiny are featured prominently. A Japanese manga called Akaboshi: Ibun Suikoden, based on the story of Water Margin, was serialised in Weekly Shonen Jump.

A Hong Kong manhua series based on Water Margin was also created by the artist Lee Chi Ching. A reimagined series based on Water Margin, 108 Fighters, was created by Andy Seto.

Between 1978 and 1988, the Italian artist Magnus published four acts of his work I Briganti, which places the Water Margin story in a setting that mixes Chinese, Western and science fiction (in Flash Gordon style) elements. Before his death in 1996, the four completed "acts" were published in a volume by Granata Press; two following "acts" were planned but never completed.

In 2007, Asiapac Books published a graphic narrative version of portions of the novel.

Film
Most film adaptations of Water Margin were produced by Hong Kong's Shaw Brothers Studio and mostly released in the 1970s and 1980s. They include: The Water Margin (1972),Dragon's Den UK directed by Chang Cheh and others; Delightful Forest (1972), directed by Chang Cheh again and starring Ti Lung as Wu Song; Pursuit (1972), directed by Kang Cheng and starring Elliot Ngok as Lin Chong; All Men Are Brothers (1975), a sequel to The Water Margin (1972) directed by Chang Cheh and others; Tiger Killer (1982), directed by Li Han-hsiang and starring Ti Lung as Wu Song again.

Other non-Shaw Brothers production include: All Men Are Brothers: Blood of the Leopard, also known as Water Margin: True Colours of Heroes (1992), which centers on the story of Lin Chong, Lu Zhishen and Gao Qiu, starring Tony Leung Ka-fai, Elvis Tsui and others; Troublesome Night 16 (2002), a Hong Kong horror comedy film which spoofs the story of Wu Song avenging his brother.

Television
Television series directly based on Water Margin include: Nippon Television's The Water Margin (1973), which was filmed in mainland China and later released in other countries outside Japan;"Originally screened on British TV in 1976" Outlaws of the Marsh (1983), which won a Golden Eagle Award; CCTV's The Water Margin (1998), produced by Zhang Jizhong and featuring fight choreography by Yuen Woo-ping; All Men Are Brothers (2011), directed by Kuk Kwok-leung and featuring actors from mainland China, Hong Kong and Taiwan.

Animations adapted from Water Margin include: Giant Robo: The Animation (1992), an anime series based on Mitsuteru Yokoyama's manga series; Outlaw Star (1998), another cartoon series which makes several references to the novel; Hero: 108 (2010), a flash animated series produced by various companies and shown on Cartoon Network. Galaxy Divine Wind Jinraiger, an anime in the J9 Series planned for a 2016 broadcast, has also cited Water Margin as its inspiration.

The 2004 Hong Kong television series Shades of Truth, produced by TVB, features three characters from the novel who are reincarnated into present-day Hong Kong as a triad boss and two police officers respectively.

Video games
Video games based on the novel include Konami's console RPG series Suikoden and Koei's strategy game Bandit Kings of Ancient China. Other games with characters based on the novel or were partly inspired by it include: Jade Empire, which features a character "Black Whirlwind" who is based on Li Kui; Data East's Outlaws Of The Lost Dynasty, which was also released under the titles Suiko Enbu and Dark Legend; Shin Megami Tensei: IMAGINE. There is also a beat em' up game Shuǐhǔ Fēngyún Chuán, created by Never Ending Soft Team and published by Kin Tec in 1996. It was re-released for the Mega Drive and in arcade version by Wah Lap in 1999. An English version titled "Water Margin: The Tales of Clouds and Winds" by Piko Interactive translated and released in 2015. Some enemy sprites are taken from other beat 'em ups and modified, including Knights of the Round, Golden Axe and Streets of Rage.MusicYan Poxi, a Pingju form of the story focused on the concubine Yan Poxi, was performed by Bai Yushuang and her company in Shanghai in the 1930s.Water Marginised (水滸後傳) (2007) is a folk reggae narrative by Chan Xuan. It tells the story of a present-day jailbird who travels to Liangshan Marsh in hope of joining the outlaw band, only to find that Song Jiang and his men have all taken bureaucratic jobs in the ruling party.

"108 Heroes" is a three-part Peking Rock Opera (first shown in 2007, 2011 and 2014 respectively) formed through a collaborative effort between the Hong Kong Arts Festival, the Shanghai International Arts Festival, Taiwan Contemporary Legend Theater, and the Shanghai Theater Academy. The show combines traditional Peking Opera singing, costumes, martial arts and dance with elements of modern music, costume and dance.

Other
Characters from the story often appear on Money-suited playing cards, which are thought to be the ancestor of both modern playing cards and mahjong tiles. These cards are also known as Water Margin cards (水滸牌).

The trading card game, Yu-Gi-Oh! has an archetype based on the 108 heroes known as the "Fire Fist" (known as "Flame Star" in the OCG) (炎えん星せい, Ensei) where the monsters aside from Horse Prince, Lion Emperor, and Spirit are based on those heroes.

The Jurchen chief and Khan Nurhaci read the Chinese novels Romance of the Three Kingdoms and Water Margin learning all he knew about Chinese military and political strategies from them.

Notes

 References 

Further reading
  reprinted at China Heritage Quarterly. Written by Jin, but attributed to Shi Nai'an.
 Dent-Young, John. "Translating Chinese Fiction: The Shui Hu Zhuan," in Sin-Wai Chan and David Pollard, An Encyclopedia of Translation: Chinese-English, English-Chinese (Hong Kong: Chinese University Press, 1995),  249–261 .
 
 Hsia, C.T., "The Water Margin," in C.T. Hsia, The Classic Chinese Novel: A Critical Introduction'' (1968; rpr. Cornell University Press, 1996), pp. 75–114.
 
 , esp. pp. 626–332.

External links

Outlaws of the Marsh: A Somewhat Less Than Critical Commentary
Outlaws of the Marsh: Chinese text with embedded Chinese-English dictionary
Yoko Miyamoto, Water Margin: Chinese Robin Hood and His Bandits (2011)
 Article about the three major editions
 Nicknames of the 108 heroes
 Stylized illustrations of the 108 heroes
 

 
Chinese novels adapted into films
14th-century Chinese novels
Chinese novels adapted into television series
Ming dynasty novels
Novels adapted into comics
Novels adapted into video games
Novels set in the Northern Song
Novels set in Hebei
Novels set in Kaifeng
Novels set in Jiangxi
Novels set in Zhejiang
Novels set in Shanxi
Novels set in Shaanxi
Novels set in Gansu
Novels about rebels
Novels set in the 12th century